Steiroxys strepens, known generally as the noisy shieldback or shield-backed katydid, is a species of shield-backed katydid in the family Tettigoniidae. It is found in North America.

References

Further reading

 
 
 

Tettigoniinae
Insects described in 1930